Centre Against Terrorism and Hybrid Threats (Czech: Centrum proti terorismu a hybridním hrozbám) is a counterpropaganda and counter-terrorism unit of the Ministry of the Interior of the Czech Republic primarily aimed at countering disinformation, fake news, hoaxes and foreign propaganda. The Centre also monitors internal security threats including migration, extremism, violation of public order and soft target attacks as well as "disinformation campaigns related to internal security".

See also 
Czech Republic–Russia relations#Russia′s espionage and other illicit activity in Czech Republic
European Centre of Excellence for Countering Hybrid Threats of Finland
European Union Intelligence and Situation Centre
Intelligence System of the Czech Republic
Security Information Service, the national intelligence agency of the Czech Republic

References

External links
Official website

2017 establishments in the Czech Republic
Foreign policy and strategy think tanks
Government ministries of the Czech Republic